Moment of Truth are a series of made-for-television films made during the 1990s and aired on NBC.

The TV movies produced in the series are as follows:

References

Television film series
Film series introduced in 1990
Lifetime (TV network) films